George Parkin may refer to:

 George Parkin (cricketer) (1864–1933), Australian cricketer
 George Parkin (footballer) (1903–1971), English footballer
 George Robert Parkin (1846–1922), Canadian educator